In algebraic geometry, a vanishing theorem gives conditions for coherent cohomology groups to vanish.
 Andreotti–Grauert vanishing theorem
 Grauert–Riemenschneider vanishing theorem
 Kawamata–Viehweg vanishing theorem
 Kodaira vanishing theorem
 Le Potier's vanishing theorem
 Mumford vanishing theorem
 Nakano vanishing theorem
 Ramanujam vanishing theorem
 Serre's vanishing theorem
 Nadel vanishing theorem
 Fujita vanishing theorem